Richard Nixon (1913–1994) was the president of the United States from 1969 to 1974.

Nixon may also refer to:

Places
Canada
Nixon, Ontario, a hamlet
United States
Nixon, Nevada, a US census-designated place
Nixon, New Jersey, an unincorporated community
Nixon, Pennsylvania, a US census-designated place
Nixon, Texas, a city
Lake Nixon, a lake and private recreation area near Little Rock, Arkansas
Nixon Lake, a lake in Minnesota

Arts and entertainment
Nixon (film), a 1995 American drama directed by Oliver Stone
Nixon: Ruin and Recovery, 1973–1990, a 1991 book by Stephen Ambrose
The Nixons, an American rock band
Nixon (album), a 2000 album by Lambchop

Other uses
Nixon (surname), a list of people and fictional characters with that name
Nixon Nitration Works, a group of plants near New Brunswick, New Jersey, site of a disastrous explosion and fire
Nixon (company), American company for watches, accessories and audio

See also
Nixon Doctrine, also known as the Guam Doctrine, put forth on July 25, 1969 by President Richard Nixon and later formalized in his speech on Vietnamization of the Vietnam War
Nixon Peabody, a US law firm
Nickson, a surname